Leonard Robert Palmer (5 June 1906, Bristol – 26 August 1984, Pitney, Somerset) was author and Professor of Comparative Philology at the University of Oxford  from 1952 to 1971. He was also a Fellow of Worcester College, Oxford. Palmer made some significant contributions to the study of Classical languages, and in the area of historical linguistics.

Career
Palmer was educated at Cardiff High School, the University of South Wales, Trinity College, Cambridge, and the University of Vienna.

He started his academic career in 1931, teaching classics at Manchester University. He held the Chair of Classical Literature at King's College, London between 1945 and 1946, followed by the Chair of Greek there from 1946 to 1952.

During World War II, Palmer worked at the Government Code and Cypher School (GC&CS) at Bletchley Park, at the so-called Hut 4. Their work was the translation, interpretation and distribution of enemy messages.

A strong focus of Palmer's work was the Greek linguistics, and in particular the language and dating of the Mycenaean Linear B tablets. He also researched the pre-Greek languages in the Aegean Sea area, their origin and chronology. Palmer also wrote an influential historical and linguistic survey of the Latin language; he later followed this with a companion work on the Greek language, focusing on its development from Linear B and its evolution into multiple dialects throughout the Aegean region.

Palmer played a role in the controversies over the dating of archaeological finds from Minoan Crete, where he disagreed with the excavator, Sir Arthur Evans, and favoured a later date.

In his book Descriptive & Comparative Linguistics (1972), among other things, he took issue with the Chomskian linguistics.

Proto-Greek studies
Palmer was one of the linguists who were investigating the theories that some unknown language or languages were spoken in prehistoric Greece before the settlement of Proto-Greek speakers in the area. So this is the question of an ancient linguistic Pre-Greek substrate in Greece. According to Palmer, this may have been one of the ancient Anatolian languages, perhaps a Luwian language. He suggested that the language of Linear A might be Luwian on the basis of -ss- and -nd- (corresponding to -ss- and -nth- in mainland Greece) placenames being widespread in Western Anatolia.

Honours
Palmer was elected Secretary and then President of the British Philological Society. He was also a corresponding member of the Deutsches Archäologisches Institut. In 1981, he received an honorary doctorate from the University of Innsbruck.

References
OBITUARY: PROF LEONARD PALMER The Times, 29 August 1984
Morpurgo Davies, A. and Meid, W. (eds), Studies in Greek, Italic and Indo-European Linguistics offered to Leonard R. Palmer on the occasion of his seventieth Birthday. Innsbruck 1976.

Publications
The Greek language (The Great languages) by Leonard Robert Palmer, 355 Pages, Published 1980 by Humanities Press 
Descriptive & Comparative Linguistics (Updated) A Critical Introduction (Studies in General Linguistics) by Leonard R. Palmer, Paperback, 430 Pages, Published 1979 by Faber & Faber 
The Latin Language. by Leonard Robert Palmer. Paperback, 372 Pages, Published 1988 by University Of Oklahoma Press. 
New Guide to the Palace of Knossos. by Leonard R. Palmer, L.R Palmer Hardcover, 144 Pages, Published 1969 by Faber And Faber 
Leonard Robert Palmer, Interpretation of Mycenaean Greek Texts (Oxford University Press academic monograph reprints) 
Leonard Robert Palmer, On the Knossos tablets: The find-places of the Knossos tablets. Book, 1963. 251 p.
Leonard Robert Palmer, Mycenaeans and Minoans; Aegean prehistory in the light of the Linear B tablets. 2d rev. ed. 1965. 368 p
Leonard Robert Palmer, A grammar of the post-Ptolemaic papyri (15 editions published between 1945 and 1948)
Leonard Robert Palmer, The language of Homer (1962)
Leonard Robert Palmer, Aegean chronology (1984)

External links
WorldCat library catalog of academic publications by Robert Palmer (over 300 results)

Linguists from the United Kingdom
British philologists
Indo-Europeanists
1906 births
1984 deaths
Diebold Professors of Comparative Philology
Fellows of Worcester College, Oxford
20th-century linguists
20th-century philologists
Bletchley Park people